is a Japanese slice of life comedy manga series written and illustrated by Shin Shinmoto. An anime television series adaptation aired on TV Tokyo between September and December 2013.

Plot
The manga follows the daily lives of two sets of twin sisters and their younger brothers.

Characters 

Chiko is the elder sister of the Shinmoto siblings and is a 2nd-year college student. She has a blonde hair and blue eyes and is fond of handsome guys. In the first episode of the anime, she doesn't seem to like college because there aren't any handsome guys. Chiko is called an otaku by Chika but seems to hate being called that. Instead, she wants to be called a bishōjo.

Chika is the younger brother of the Shinmoto siblings and is a 2nd year high school student. He has blonde hair and blue eyes like his sister. He is popular with the girls in his school which is annoying to his sister.

The Saitō siblings are as weird and quiet as their calm faces. They often visit the Shinmoto siblings when they are bored. Both of the siblings are popular wherever they go.

Mako is the elder sister of the Saitō siblings and a part-time worker outside. Her education status is unknown. She is seen practicing an alien language with her hand puppet in the first episode of the anime. She is an idol otaku.

Mao is the younger brother of the Saitō siblings and a 2nd year high school student, just like Chika. He resembles his sister and is also seen with his hand puppet in the first episode of the anime. Mao seems to have a crush on Chiko.

Media

Manga 
The manga is written and illustrated by Shin Shinmoto and has been serialized in the G-Mode's web magazine Comic Polaris since November 2012. The series has been collected in eleven tankōbon volumes, released in Japan between November 22, 2012, and October 11, 2018.
On April 20, 2017, a spin-off was announced "Super Seisyun Brothers PLUS", changing to big brothers and little sisters, as it was serialized it has been renamed to "Suki desu, Tonari no Onii-chan".

Anime 
An anime television series adaptation, produced by AIC Plus+, aired in Japan on TV Tokyo between September 13 and December 13, 2013. The series is directed by Masahiro Takata with composition by Tomoko Konparu, and character design by Noriko Morishima.

References

External links
Super Seisyun Brothers on Comic Polaris 
Official anime website 

Anime International Company
Anime series based on manga
Comedy anime and manga
Japanese comedy webcomics
Slice of life anime and manga
TV Tokyo original programming
Webcomics in print